The 1994–95 Michigan Wolverines men's basketball team represented the University of Michigan in intercollegiate college basketball during the 1994–95 season. The team played its home games in the Crisler Arena in Ann Arbor, Michigan, and was a member of the Big Ten Conference.  Under the direction of head coach Steve Fisher, the team finished tied for third in the Big Ten Conference.  The team earned an invitation to the 1995 NCAA Division I men's basketball tournament as a number nine seed where it was eliminated in the first round. The team was ranked for five of the eighteen weeks of Associated Press Top Twenty-Five Poll, starting the season ranked sixteenth, peaking at number thirteen and ending unranked, and it also ended the season unranked in the final USA Today/CNN Poll.  The team had a 2–5 record against ranked teams, including the following victories: January 11, 1995, against #19 Iowa 83–82 in double overtime and January 17, 1995, against #20 Illinois 69–59 on the road.

Seniors Jimmy King and Ray Jackson, the last remaining players from the Fab Five, served as team co-captains and shared team MVP honors.  The team's leading scorers were Ray Jackson (491 points), Jimmy King (457 points), and Maurice Taylor (384 points).  The leading rebounders were Maceo Boston (165), Ray Jackson (163), and Maurice Taylor (158).

Maceo Baston posted a single-season field goal percentage of 67.42%, surpassing the school record 66.12% set by Loy Vaught in 1989. Baston would rebreak the record the following year.  The team led the conference in field goal percentage defense (39.4%).

On December 3, 1994, the team totaled 18 single-game steals against UT-Chattanooga, which set the current school record, surpassing the 17 on February 26, 1977.

In the 64-team 1995 NCAA Division I men's basketball tournament, the team earned a number nine seed but was eliminated in the first round Midwest region game by number the eight-seeded and number twenty-one ranked Western Kentucky Hilltoppers 82–76 at University of Dayton Arena, ending the team's season on March 16, 1995.

Rankings

Team players drafted into the NBA
Four players from this team were selected in the NBA draft.

See also
1995 NCAA Division I men's basketball tournament
NCAA Men's Division I tournament bids by school
NCAA Men's Division I tournament bids by school and conference
NCAA Division I men's basketball tournament all-time team records

References

Michigan Wolverines men's basketball seasons
Michigan
Michigan
Michigan
Michigan